The Liberal Party of Honduras (Spanish: Partido Liberal de Honduras) is a centrist liberal political party in Honduras that was founded in 1891. It is the oldest extant political party in the country, and one of the two main parties that have until recently dominated Honduran politics. The party is a member of the Liberal International. The PLH is identified with the colours red and white, as the flag Francisco Morazán used in most of his military campaigns during time of the Central American Federal Republic.

The party is against the legalisation of abortion, which is punishable by imprisonment in Honduras.

2001 elections
At the legislative elections, held on 25 November 2001, the party won 40.8% of the popular vote and 55 out of 128 seats in Congress. Its candidate at the presidential elections, Rafael Pineda Ponce won 44.3%, but was defeated by Ricardo Maduro of the National Party of Honduras.

2005 elections
The PLH won the closely contested 2005 presidential race, but  the PNH has a majority in the National Congress due to an alliance with the Christian Democrats (Democracia Cristiana).

In the general election of 27 November 2005, the party won 62 out of 128 seats in the National Congress; and its Presidential candidate, Manuel Zelaya, polled 49.9% to defeat the PNH's Porfirio Pepe Lobo, restoring the PLH as the presidential party. He was inaugurated on 27 January 2006.

Elected as a liberal, Zelaya shifted dramatically to the political left and socialism during his presidency, forging an alliance with the Hugo Chávez-linked ALBA, angering conservatives and his own Liberal Party. He was deposed by a coup d'état in 2009 and replaced by Roberto Micheletti, also of the Liberal Party.

2009 elections
At the 2009 elections, which took place after the 2009 Honduran coup d'état that removed Manuel Zelaya from power, the Liberal Party suffered a heavy defeat by the National Party, with the Nationals' candidate for president, Porfirio Lobo Sosa, winning the presidency with (according to the Electoral Tribunal) over 1,212,846 votes and 56.56% of the national total of valid votes (in all participation as acknowledged by the tribunal was of 41%) compared with 816,874 votes and 38.1% of the national total for Liberal candidate Elvin Santos. In the elections for the National Congress of Honduras the Liberal Party won a total of 45 seats, dropping from its previous 61. The elections were held under a tense political atmosphere without the accustomed OAS observers and under a decree restricting civil rights with the elected president Zelaya under military siege in the Brazilian embassy at Tegucigalpa. Sectors opposed to the 2009 coup claim the participation was much less than reported by the authorities, but this claim has not been verified.

In 2011 Zelaya's supporters left the Liberal Party and founded Liberty and Refoundation.

Recent activities 
Following Zelaya's split, the Liberal Party has seen a decline in its support. At the 2013 election, liberal candidate Mauricio Villeda got 20.3% of votes, arriving third.

The party further declined in the 2017 election, its candidate Luis Zelaya only obtaining 14.74% and again arriving third. However, the party maintained its 26 seats in the parliament. The Liberal Party denounced the result as fraudulent.

Electoral history

Presidential elections

Note 
In the 1957 election Ramón Villeda Morales was elected by the Constituent Assembly

National Congress elections

See also
Liberalism worldwide
List of liberal parties
Liberalism in Honduras

References

External links
Liberal Party of Honduras official site

Liberal International
Liberal parties in North America
Political parties in Honduras
Political parties established in 1891
1891 establishments in Honduras